Kathryn Wolfe is an English television director, author and university lecturer.

Kathryn was born and grew up in North London where she attended Henrietta Barnett Grammar School in Hampstead Garden Suburb. She went on to study BA Hons Drama at Bristol University and after graduating joined the BBC where she trained as a TV director.

Her father was TV situation comedy scriptwriter Ronald Wolfe. Her cousins include actor Warren Mitchell and Clive Wolfe Festival Director of the National Student Drama Festival (NSDF) 1971-2000. Kathryn has been married to actor/writer/producer Arif Hussein, CEO of Kaos Films and founder of the British Short Screenplay Competition (BSSC), since 1996. They have two children and live in London.

In 2006 Kathryn was appointed Senior Lecturer Media Performance and Course Leader Television Production at the University of Bedfordshire. Her book So You Want To Be A TV Presenter? was published by Nick Hern Books in May 2010.

TV Credits - Factual Programmes

(*)Award New York Film & TV Festival

TV Credits - Children's Programmes

TV Credits - News/Live Programmes

TV Credits - Drama Reconstruction Programmes

TV Credits - Magazine Programmes

References

External links 
 https://www.imdb.com
 https://www.amazon.co.uk

English television directors
Academics of the University of Bedfordshire
English non-fiction writers
Living people
Year of birth missing (living people)